Russkaya Bundevka is a rural locality (a selo) in Rudnyanskoye Urban Settlement, Rudnyansky District, Volgograd Oblast, Russia. The population was 194 as of 2010. There are 2 streets.

Geography 
Russkaya Bundevka is located in steppe, 19 km west of Rudnya (the district's administrative centre) by road. Ilmen is the nearest rural locality.

References 

Rural localities in Rudnyansky District, Volgograd Oblast